The Society for Pentecostal Studies (SPS) is an American scholarly association of biblical scholars, theologians, and others who are members of Pentecostal churches or are involved in the Charismatic Renewal. It was founded in 1970.  The members of the Society consider themselves responsible for recording the history and developing the theology of these grassroots movements that have influenced Christianity worldwide.

Overview 
SPS was first envisioned by three classical Pentecostals, Dr. William W. Menzies of the Assemblies of God, Dr. H. Vinson Synan of the International Pentecostal Holiness Church, and Dr. Horace Ward of the Church of God. The original requirement for membership was adherence to the statement of faith of the Pentecostal Fellowship of North America. However, because nontrinitarians and others were unable to sign the statement for doctrinal reasons, this requirement was eventually eliminated.

The purpose of the Society, as defined on its website, is to provide a scholarly forum in which to interpret the Pentecostal movement as well as "to stimulate, encourage, recognize, and publicize the work of Pentecostal and Charismatic scholars and scholars of Pentecostalism; to study the implications of Pentecostal theology in relation to other academic disciplines, seeking a Pentecostal world-and-life view; and to support fully, to the extent appropriate for an academic society, the following statement of purposes:

-To encourage fellowship and facilitate co-ordination of effort among Pentecostal believers throughout the world.

-To demonstrate to the world the essential unity of Spirit-baptized believers, fulfilling the prayer of the Lord Jesus Christ, “That they all may be one” (John 17:21).

-To cooperate in an endeavor to respond to the unchanging commission of the Lord Jesus, to carry His message to all people of all nations.

-To promote courtesy and mutual understanding, “endeavoring to keep the unity of the Spirit in the bond of peace, until we all come in the unity of the faith” (Ephesians 4:3, 13).

-To afford prayerful and practical assistance to any Pentecostal body in need of such.

-To promote and maintain the scriptural purity of the Society by Bible study and prayer.

-To uphold and maintain those Pentecostal truths, “most surely believed among us” (Luke 1:1)."

The Society holds annual conferences. The organization, which began as a scholarly branch of classical Pentecostalism, is now ecumenical, with over 500 members from all major Christian denominations. For many years, the Society has hosted the meetings of the Roman Catholic/Pentecostal dialogue (see Pontifical Council for Promoting Christian Unity).

Past Presidents 

 William W. Menzies (1971)
 R. Hollis Gause (1972)
 Russell P. Spittler (1973)
 H. Vinson Synan (1974)
 Leonard Lovett (1975)
 Don Argue (1976)
 Horace S. Ward (1977)
 Anthony Palma (1978)
 James Beaty (1979)
 Stanley M. Horton (1980)
 Ithiel Clemmons (1981)
 William G. MacDonald (1982)
 Cecil M. Robeck Jr. (1983)
 Harold D. Hunter (1984)
 J. Rodman Williams (1985)
 Peter Hocken (1986)
 Edith Waldvogel Blumhofer (1987)
 Ronald Kydd (1988)
 Donald W. Dayton (1989)
 Manuel J. Gaxiola-Gaxiola (1990)
 Murray W. Dempster (1991)
 D. William Faupel (1992)
 Cheryl Bridges Johns (1993)
 Roger Stronstad (1994)
 Eldin Villafañe (1996)

 Grant Wacker (1997)
 J. Chris Thomas (1998)
 Rebecca Skaggs (1999)
 Frank D. Macchia (2000)
 Sherry DuPree (2001)
 Samuel Solivan (2002)
 Ralph Del Colle (2003)
 Steven Jack Land (2004)
 Anthea Butler (2005)
 Blaine Charette (2006)
 David Daniels (2007)
 Terry Cross (2008)
 Amos Yong (2009)
 Estrelda Alexander (2010)
 Kimberly Ervin Alexander (2011)
 Jeff Gros (2012)
 Paul Alexander (2013)
 Lee Roy Martin (2014)
 Kenneth J. Archer (2015)
 Michael Wilkinson (2016)
 Jacqueline Grey (2017)
 Mark Cartledge (2018)
 Martin Mittelstadt (2019)
 No Conference - Covid 19 (2020)
 Martin Mittelstadt (2021)
 Melissa Archer (2022)

Executive Directors 

 Vinson Synan (1970)
 James Beaty (1973)
 Horace Ward (1978)
 Vinson Synan (1980)
 Russell P. Spittler (1983)
 Peter Hocken (1988)
 D. William Faupel (1997)
 David Roebuck (2004)
 Lois E. Olena (2011)
 Margaret English de Alminana (2016)
 Adrian Hinkle (2019)

Pneuma 
The society publishes Pneuma: The Journal of the Society for Pentecostal Studies, first published in 1970.

See also 
 Charismatic Christianity

References

External links 
 Official website (United States)
 Pneuma

Pentecostalism in the United States
Christian organizations established in 1970
Biblical studies organizations